Racecourse Farm Fields is a 5 hectare biological Site of Special Scientific Interest in Easton on the Hill in Northamptonshire.

This former quarry is grassland on Jurassic limestone. The flora is diverse, with over thirty flowering plant species in each square metre. There are several locally rare plants, such as dodder, autumn gentian, clustered bellflower and small scabious. The sward is kept short by grazing by sheep and cattle.

The site is private land with no public access.

References

Sites of Special Scientific Interest in Northamptonshire